The 2008–09 Four Hills Tournament was held at the four traditional venues of Oberstdorf, Garmisch-Partenkirchen, Innsbruck and Bischofshofen, located in Germany and Austria.

The tournament was won by Austria's Wolfgang Loitzl, who previously had not won a single World Cup event in his career. Loitzl won the last three competitions at Garmisch-Partenkirchen, Innsbruck and Bischofshofen to claim the overall victory, and became the first Austrian to win the Four Hills since Andreas Widhölzl in 1999–2000. The opening event at Oberstdorf was won by Switzerland' s Simon Ammann, who was the overall World Cup leader at the time of the competition. Ammann also finished second overall in the Four Hills. Austria's Gregor Schlierenzauer finished third overall, while Martin Schmitt of Germany and Dimitry Vassiliev of Russia rounded out the top five.

Overall standings

Oberstdorf
 HS137 Schattenbergschanze, Germany
29 December 2008

Garmisch-Partenkirchen
 HS140 Große Olympiaschanze, Germany
1 January 2009

Innsbruck
 HS130 Bergiselschanze, Austria
4 January 2009

Bischofshofen

 HS140 Paul-Ausserleitner-Schanze, Austria
6 January 2009

See also
2008–09 Ski Jumping World Cup

References

Four Hills Tournament
Four Hills Tournament, 2008-09
Four Hills Tournament, 2008-09
2008 in German sport
2009 in German sport
2009 in Austrian sport